Woodhouse is a hamlet in southern Alberta, Canada within the Municipal District of Willow Creek No. 26.

During the second world war the Royal Canadian Air Force established a Relief Aerodrome near the hamlet.

Demographics 
Woodhouse recorded a population of 15 in the 1991 Census of Population conducted by Statistics Canada.

See also 
List of communities in Alberta
List of hamlets in Alberta

References 

Hamlets in Alberta
Municipal District of Willow Creek No. 26